is a Japanese manga series written and illustrated by Yasuhiro Nightow. It was first serialized in Tokuma Shoten's shōnen manga magazine Monthly Shōnen Captain from April 1995 to January 1997, when the magazine ceased its publication; its chapters were collected in three tankōbon volumes. The series continued its publication in Shōnen Gahosha's seinen manga magazine Young King OURs, under the title Trigun Maximum, from October 1997 to March 2007. Shōnen Gahosha republished the Trigun chapters in two volumes, and collected the Trigun Maximum chapters in 14 volumes.

Set on the fictional planet known as No Man's Land, the plot follows Vash the Stampede, a famous gunman who is constantly fighting bounty hunters seeking to obtain the immense bounty on his head. As the narrative progresses, Vash's past is explored. Trigun originated from Nightow's fascination with Western movies. Nightow wanted Vash to be different from cowboys in Western movies by avoiding killing enemies and instead exploring the characters involved in each story arc.

Trigun was adapted into a 26-episode anime television series by Madhouse; it aired on TV Tokyo from April to September 1998. An anime feature film, Trigun: Badlands Rumble, premiered in Japan in April 2010. A second anime television series adaptation by Orange, titled Trigun Stampede, premiered in January 2023. In North America, both manga series have been licensed by Dark Horse Comics. The anime series was first licensed by Geneon Entertainment and started broadcast in the United States, as part of Cartoon Network's Adult Swim programming block, in 2003; the series was later licensed by Funimation.

In 2009, Trigun Maximum won the Best Comic category at the 40th Seiun Awards. Critical response to the manga has been generally positive based on Vash and his friends' actions and relationships, as well as the handling of action scenes. However, critics disliked Vash's predicament in regards to his pacifism and the plot being hard to understand. The anime series was similarly positively received.

Plot

In the 32nd century, a man known as "Vash the Stampede" has earned a bounty of $$60 billion ("double dollar") on his head and the nickname  after accidentally destroying a city with his supernatural powers. However, whenever he is attacked, Vash displays a pacifist personality as noted by two Bernardelli Insurance Society employees, Meryl Stryfe and Milly Thompson, who follow him around in order to minimize the damages inevitably caused by his appearance. Most of the damage attributed to Vash is actually caused by bounty hunters in pursuit of the sixty billion double-dollar bounty on Vash's head for the destruction of the city of July. However, he cannot remember the incident due to retrograde amnesia, being able to recall only fragments of the destroyed city and memories of his childhood. Throughout his travels, Vash tries to save lives using non-lethal force. He is occasionally joined by a priest, Nicholas D. Wolfwood, who, like Vash, is a superb gunfighter with a mysterious past. As the series progresses, more about Vash's past and the history of human civilization on the planet is revealed.

Vash and his twin brother Knives were originally two children with a slow aging process found in a spaceship that escaped from the planet Earth after mankind had exhausted all its resources. Rem raised them but Knives became nihilistic and had most of the people in the ship disposed of. As a result, Vash lives to find his twin and have revenge. Vash is targeted by Legato Bluesummers from the Gung-ho Guns assassins who are followers of Knives. Wolfwood himself is a Gung-Ho Gun but was hired to make sure Vash does not die and instead suffer. Vash and Knives both possess the Angel Arm, which Knives forced Vash to use in the series' beginning to destroy the town.

Vash eventually fights Knives but is defeated. Wolfwood betrays Knives and saves Vash. In the aftermath, Wolfwood dies fighting one of the Gung-Hos; his friend, Livio, joins Vash's cause while grieving for his friend's death. As Knives approaches the city with the "Ark", a floating ship designed to leave humans without any resources and end life on the planet. Knives begins dueling with Vash. Throughout his past battles that required him to use the Angel's Arm, Vash has transformed into a regular human signified by his blond hair now turned black. Knives also starts losing the powers he stored with the Ark through Vash's actions. Vash then saves his brother from the vengeful ships from Earth. Following his defeat, Knives uses his last powers to help his weakened brother by creating a small fruit tree to feed him. After his brother's death, Vash continues his travels on the planet with Meryl and Milly.

Production

After leaving college, Yasuhiro Nightow had gone to work selling apartments for the housing corporation Sekisui House, but struggled to keep up with his manga drawing hobby. Reassured by some successes, including a serialized manga based on the popular video game franchise Samurai Spirits for Family Computer Magazine, he quit his job to draw full-time. The series was conceptualized as a mix between Western and science fiction as Nightow found it not seen in Japan by the time he started writing Trigun. To contrast Vash from the typical heroes in action films, Nightow portrayed him as a pacifist since he did not want his lead character to be a murderer. Throughout the story, Vash avoids killing enemies by disarming them and avoids inflicting mortal wounds during combat. His cheerful personality was used to highlight this trait with his catchphrase being: "Hey, sorry. Love and peace?" Other elements of the manga were based on real life. Wolfwood's name was taken from the lead singer as his image for the priest. He is also modeled on Tortoise Matsumoto from the band Ulfuls. In order to create "warm" environments, Nightow drew several eating scenes.

In the making of the manga, Nightow attempts to draw the fight scenes carefully as he has "all these images running through my head of characters moving this way and that, and contorting into all sort sorts of amazing action poses, but thinking about it and putting it to paper are always two different things". In regards to the narrative, Nightow uses a "logical and intuitive manner" as his modus operandi in order to make readers being capable of following it. While Vash is the manga's protagonist, anime director Satoshi Nishimura used Meryl Stryfe as the main character. In the anime, she searches for the Humanoid Typhoon and initially does not believe it is Vash due to his childish behavior. To create suspense, writer Yōsuke Kuroda suggested that Vash would not shoot a bullet until the fifth episode, which causes Meryl to realize he is the famous gunman.

Media

Manga

With the help of a publisher friend, Yasuhiro Nightow,
first published a one-shot of Trigun in Tokuma Shoten's shōnen manga magazine  in February 1995; it began its regular serialization in the same magazine two months later in April. Monthly Shōnen Captain ceased publication in January 1997, and the series was put on hiatus. Tokuma Shoten collected the Trigun chapters in three tankōbon volumes, released from April 25, 1996, to January 20, 1999; Shōnen Gahōsha republished the Trigun chapters in two volumes, released on June 2, 2000.

When Nightow was approached by Shōnen Gahōsha's seinen manga magazine Young King OURs, they were interested in him beginning a new work. Nightow, however, was troubled by the idea of leaving Trigun incomplete, and requested to be allowed to finish the series. The manga resumed its publication in the magazine, under the title , in October 1997. Nightow said that there was no difference in the story between the two titles, and that the only reason for the change was because of the switch of publishing house. Trigun Maximum finished in March 2007. Shōnen Gahōsha collected its chapters in fourteen tankōbon volumes, released from May 23, 1998, to February 27, 2008.

In North America, the manga was licensed by Dark Horse Comics, who announced its publication in June 2003; they released the two volumes of Trigun, based on the Shōnen Gahosha's edition, on October 15, 2003, and January 7, 2004. In March 2004, Dark Horse Comics announced that they would also publish Trigun Maximum; the fourteen volumes were released from May 26, 2004, to April 8, 2009. In September 2012, Dark Horse Comics announced that they would release the series in an omnibus edition; Trigun was released in a single volume on October 9, 2013; Trigun Maximum was released in five volumes from November 21, 2012, to November 5, 2014.

An anthology manga titled Trigun: Multiple Bullets, featuring short stories written by several manga artists such as Boichi, Masakazu Ishiguru, Satoshi Mizukami, Ark Performance, Yusuke Takeyama, Yuga Takauchi, and Akira Sagami, was released by Shōnen Gahosha in Japan on December 28, 2011. The volume was released by Dark Horse Comics on March 6, 2013.

Anime

1998 series

Trigun was adapted into an anime television series. It was animated by Madhouse and directed by Satoshi Nishimura, written by Yōsuke Kuroda, and produced by Shigeru Kitayama. The music was composed by Tsuneo Imahori. Twenty-six episodes aired on TV Tokyo from April 1 to September 30, 1998. The episodes were collected in thirteen VHS cassettes, labeled as "Stages", from August 5, 1998, to August 4, 1999.

In North America, the series was first licensed by Pioneer Entertainment (later Geneon USA) in 1999. Eight DVDs were released from March 28, 2000, to May 29, 2001. A box set containing all the episodes was released on November 20, 2001. The series premiered on Cartoon Network's Adult Swim programming block on March 31, 2003. The series also premiered in Canada on G4techTV's Anime Current programming block in 2007. In the same year, Geneon announced that they would cease their in-house distribution, In 2008, Funimation announced that they signed a deal with Geneon to distribute "select" titles from the company; in 2010, they announced that they had licensed Trigun for a DVD and Blu-ray Disc home video release, and launched it on October 26, 2010. Following the announcement that Funimation would be unified under the Crunchyroll brand, the series began streaming on the platform in May 2022.

Trigun Stampede

A second anime television series adaptation by Orange, titled Trigun Stampede, premiered on January 7, 2023, on TV Tokyo and other networks.

Film

A Trigun film was originally announced in February 2008 to be released in 2009. The film titled Trigun: Badlands Rumble opened in theaters in Japan on April 24, 2010, and was first shown to an American audience at the Sakura-Con 2010 in Seattle, Washington on, April 2, 2010.

At Anime Expo 2010, Funimation announced that they had licensed the film as they had with the TV series and planned to release it into theaters. The film made its US television premiere on Saturday, December 28, 2013, on Adult Swim's Toonami block.

Reception

Manga
Trigun Maximum won the Best Comic at the 40th Seiun Award in the 48th Japan Science Fiction Convention in 2009. The second volume concluded the original series early the next year, and went on to be the top earning manga release of 2004. Critical response to the manga has been positive. Manga Life enjoyed the setting, comparing it to the American Midwest in the 1800s. They called the lead's characterization "fantastic" based on the personality he displays when facing enemies as he refuses to murder anybody. Anime News Network compared the series to Rurouni Kenshin, based on both's pacifist messages to the audience and how challenging is this message explored in a similar fashion to comic book hero Batman. He also praised the fight scenes' handling as well as villains' designs. The clash between him and his antagonist was also praised for his execution and artwork. However, Mania Entertainment said some events that happened to Vash might come across as repetitive because his pacifism keeps backfiring and no proper solution has yet been given. As Vash's philosophy was tested in the finale, Fandom Post praised the consequences of his actions. While Vash and Knives' was popular, to the point Mania referred to their final fight as "the stuff of legend." On the other hand, the book Manga: The Complete Guide provided criticism to some parts of the narrative, finding it difficult to follow but still enjoyable. The artwork was also praised in the character designs with Wolfwood being called as one of the most stylish manga and anime characters.

Anime
The anime series is frequently listed as one of the best anime series; in 2001, Wizard's Anime Magazine listed Trigun as the 38th best series on their "Top 50 Anime released in North America", and in 2010 The Los Angeles Times journalist Charles Solomon placed the series as the seventh best anime on his "Top 10". The success of the animated series increased the popularity of the original manga source material with the US release's first volume run of 35,000 sold out shortly after release. In regards to the anime adaptation, Theron Martin of Anime News Network gave the anime adaptation a B+ praising the writing stating, "The series never wallows in the inherent to this format simply because the surprisingly high quality of its writing never allows that to happen." However he continued to criticize the visuals stating, "Character rendering regularly looks more like rough drafts than refined final products, with the artists often struggling just to stay on model." Mike Toole of Anime News Network named Trigun as one of the most important anime of the 1990s.

Escapist Magazine columnist H.D. Russell reviewed the anime adaptation of the series in early 2016, as part of the "Good Old Anime Review" section focusing on popular anime of the 1990s to early 2000s. Though, noting the series hasn't aged well in terms of animation and English voice acting quality, Russell states the depth of the characters and moral themes of the series more than compensate for its faults. Russell concluded his review giving Trigun a rank of four out of a five stars stating, "Trigun is very often overshadowed by its close cousin Cowboy Bebop, which is sad, because it truly is a delight to watch. Despite having only decent voice acting (with a few exceptions), average music, and relatively static visuals, Trigun is an absolute blast that had me laughing and thinking the whole way. While it's not perfect, it is fun and it does ask the questions that will make viewers ponder for years to come without ever offering them an answer. Trigun is one that went straight from my backlog to my heart and is truly greater than the sum of its parts." Despite its relative popularity in the West, Trigun never gained widespread appeal to Japanese audiences. Suggested factors include the "old west" setting, European style character names and a lack of Japanese cultural elements. This would make Trigun one of the rare examples of an anime that is far more successful in the West than it was within its country of origin. The show failed to garner a large audience in Japan during its original showing in 1998, but gained a substantial fan base following its United States premiere on Adult Swim in 2003.

Notes

References

External links

  
 

Trigun
1996 manga
1998 anime television series debuts
Action anime and manga
Anime series based on manga
Crunchyroll anime
Cyborgs in anime and manga
Fiction about telepathy
Geneon USA
Madhouse (company)
Madman Entertainment anime
Madman Entertainment manga
Post-apocalyptic anime and manga
Robots in television
Seinen manga
Shōnen Gahōsha manga
Shōnen manga
Space Western anime and manga
Television shows written by Yōsuke Kuroda
Tokuma Shoten manga
Toonami
TV Tokyo original programming